Homecoming is the thirteenth live album by California-based worship collective Bethel Music. The album was released through the collective's imprint label, Bethel Music, on September 24, 2021. The featured worship leaders on the album are Cory Asbury, Zahriya Zachary, Jonathan David Helser, Melissa Helser, David Funk, Dante Bowe, Hannah McClure, Brandon Lake, Paul McClure, Brian Johnson, Jenn Johnson, Josh Baldwin, Emmy Rose, Kristene DiMarco, and Bethany Wohrle, with guest appearances from Gable Price, Matt Redman, Naomi Raine and Chris Quilala.

The album was supported by the release of "Too Good to Not Believe" as the lead single, followed by the release of "Homecoming" and "I Believe" as promotional singles.

Homecoming debuted at No. 3 on Billboards Top Christian Albums chart in the United States. The album received a GMA Dove Award nomination for Worship Album of the Year at the 2022 GMA Dove Awards.

On October 29, 2021 a Spanish version of Homecoming was released titled Homecoming (Español). It features Gable Price, Zahriya Zachary, Jonathan David Helser, Melissa Helser, David Funk, Hannah McClure, Paul McClure, Brian Johnson, Jenn Johnson, Josh Baldwin, Emmy Rose, Kristene DiMarco, and Bethany Wohrle, with guest appearances from Naomi Raine, Chris Quilala, Christine D'Clario, Edward Rivera, and Aaron Moses.

Background
On September 3, 2021, Bethel Music announced that they would release the album Homecoming on September 24, 2021, revealing the tracks appearing on the album and making it available it for digital pre-saving. Christian Ostrom, creative director of Bethel Music, shared the inspiration behind the album, saying:

Release and promotion

Singles
Bethel Music and Brandon Lake released "Too Good to Not Believe" as the lead single from the album on May 21, 2021.

Promotional singles
Bethel Music and Cory Asbury released "Homecoming" featuring Gable Price as the first promotional single of the album on September 10, 2021.

Bethel Music, Jonathan David Helser and Melissa Helser released "I Believe" as the second promotional single from the album on September 17, 2021.

Reception

Critical response

JubileeCast's Timothy Yap gave a favourable review of the album, saying: "As expected, Homecoming (Live) doesn't disappoint. Though not all the songs are perfect, there's enough here to form the soundscape of worship for both the church and individuals." Joshua Andre in his 365 Days of Inspiring Media review gave a psotive review of the album, saying: "this overall musical masterpiece is a treasure that is to be explored over and over. With the lead vocalists sharing their voices on the album in perfect harmony and unison; Bethel Music remind us of the power in their live worship anthems, unveiling a very layered and unique album." Jono Davies, reviewing for Louder Than the Music, said: "It's refreshing to read that, they are not just putting anything out, this is a really exciting album."

Accolades

Track listing

Charts

Weekly charts

Year-end charts

Release history

References

External links
 

2021 albums
Bethel Music albums